Irish Creek is a stream in the U.S. state of South Dakota.

A large share of the first settlers being natives of Ireland most likely caused the name Irish Creek to be selected.

See also
List of rivers of South Dakota

References

Rivers of Ziebach County, South Dakota
Rivers of South Dakota